Achada Longueira is a settlement in the northern part of the island of Santiago, Cape Verde. It is part of the municipality of Tarrafal. In 2010, its population was 520.

References

Villages and settlements in Santiago, Cape Verde
Tarrafal Municipality